Asam Sahitya Sabha Patrika (Ôxôm Xahityô Xôbha Pôtrika) is an official journal of the Asam Sahitya Sabha. The first issue appeared in October, 1927. Chandradhar Barua was the founder editor of the journal who edited the journal until 1936.

List of Editors

See also
 Assam Sahitya Sabha
 List of Asam Sahitya Sabha
 History of Assamese literature
 Oxomiya Bhaxa Unnati Xadhini Xobha

References

External links
 Link to published editions

Assamese literature
Books from Assam
Literary magazines published in India
Quarterly magazines published in India
Magazines established in 1927